Makom Solel Lakeside of Highland Park, Illinois traces its roots through two Reform Jewish Congregations, Congregation Solel and Lakeside Congregation for Reform Judaism that were founded in 1957 and 1955 respectively. The two came together in 2019 and currently serve more than 500 households. Each legacy congregation was one of the first Reform synagogues in the North Shore of Chicago.

Founding
Congregation Solel began as a branch of the oldest synagogue in Illinois, Congregation Kehilat Anshei Maavriv – Congregation of the Men of the West (now KAM Isaiah Israel), located on Chicago's South Side. When a group of families moved from the South Side to the North Shore suburbs of Highland Park, Glencoe and Winnetka, they sought to create a similar congregation in their new community. KAM's rabbi at the time, Jacob Weinstein, planned to move to the North Shore to lead the congregation. After one year of traveling back and forth between the two synagogues, Rabbi Weinstein made the decision to stay in Hyde Park, and KAM-North Shore, (as Solel was then called) hired its first full-time Rabbi, Arnold Jacob Wolf.

Lakeside Congregation for Reform Judaism has its earliest roots in the same transition of Jews from the South Side to the North Shore, but its founders came primarily from Congregation Sinai (now in the near north of downtown Chicago).  Under the auspices of the American Council for Judaism, the School for Judaism was founded and began meeting as a supplemental school for children, making it the oldest institution of Reform Judaism in Highland Park.  In 1955 the school families decided to incorporate as Lakeside Congregation and hired their first rabbi, Dr. Richard Singer who guided the congregation through their first five years, leaving to become a Jungian analyst in 1960.  His wife June Singer was one of the foremost Jungian scholars in the world.

Rabbis

Rabbi Arnold Jacob Wolf, 1957–1972 

Rabbi Arnold Jacob Wolf began his storied career at Congregation Solel. He is said to have suggested the name Solel, which had never previously been used as a name for a synagogue. (It has since been adopted by several synagogues.) The Hebrew word Solel means "pathfinder," or "trailblazer." Correction: Solel in Hebrew means "paver" (as in to pave a road). It does not mean either of the given translations in this paragraph.

Under Rabbi Wolf's leadership, the congregation grew rapidly, and instituted an array of new programs including free trips to Israel for students who completed four years of Hebrew education, havurot (Jewish fellowship groups), and an emphasis on lay involvement and participation. The temple inaugurated annual Holocaust remembrance weekends, one of the first synagogues to do so. The temple pursued an agenda of social justice.  Martin Luther King Jr. accepted an invitation from Rabbi Wolf and spoke at Congregation Solel on June 30, 1966. Rabbi Wolf also invited the Chicago Seven to speak at the synagogue in 1968.
Dr. King's speech at Congregation Solel was under the auspices of the North Shore Fellowship of Rabbis.  By that time Rabbi Joseph Ginsberg was leading Lakeside Congregation as he did until his retirement in 1972.  Rabbi Ginsberg came to Lakeside after many years leading the Jews of Peoria, IL.  His synagogue was bombed not long after the more famous bombing of the synagogue in Atlanta by white supremacists.  He, like Rabbi Wolf, was a champion of civil rights and helped create a day camp in partnership with the North Shore Unitarian Church that created a dialog between children of the north shore congregations and African Americans from the city of Chicago in an all day childcare daycamp environment.

In the late 1960s, Congregation Solel was among the first American synagogues to begin to "transform themselves along the havurah model."  Under the leadership of Rabbi Arnold Jacob Wolf, the new community was "intellectual, political, and exceedingly innovative and radical in its expectations." Solel was a community that would pioneer egalitarianism, and focus on study, prayer and action." Assisting Wolf was Rabbi Lawrence Kushner, who held the position "Rabbinic Fellow."

The congregation also kept a capped membership, seeking to preserve an intimately sized community where people would know one another and the rabbi. Rabbi Wolf, dissatisfied with synagogue world and convinced that the center of real change in the nation and in the Jewish community was on college campuses, left in 1972 to become the Jewish chaplain at Yale University.  He continued his outspoken leadership on civil rights, against the Viet Nam War, and for justice and equity for Israelis and Palestinians.  He was among the founders of Breira (Hebrew for choice), the first American Jewish organization to speak out against the treatment of Palestinians in occupied territory and call for negotiations and settlement of the issue that continues to plague Israel and the middle east today.
Meanwhile, in the 1970s and 1980s Lakeside Congregation was led by Rabbi Bruce Freyer, a Viet Nam veteran who also spoke out against the war, and then by Rabbi Harold Jaye, an academic, who left the congregational rabbinate to become a full-time university professor in Florida.  Rabbi Charles Levi led the congregation into the 1990s.

Rabbi Robert J. Marx, 1973–1983
Rabbi Robert Marx left his position as the regional director of the Union of American Hebrew Congregations (UAHC, now the Union for Reform Judaism, URJ) office to become the rabbi of Solel. In 1964, Rabbi Marx had founded the Jewish Council on Urban Affairs, an organization that "combats poverty, racism and anti-Semitism in partnership with Chicago's diverse communities." During his tenure at Solel, the congregation expanded its social justice programs.

Rabbi Dov Taylor, 1984–2009
Rabbi Dov Taylor was senior rabbi of Temple Ohabei Shalom, in Brookline, Massachusetts, when he accepted the invitation to serve as Rabbi of Congregation Solel. Rabbi Taylor deepened the congregation's commitment to Jewish learning, teaching an array of adult education classes that drew participants from throughout Chicago. During Rabbi Taylor's tenure, the congregation also became a tremendous leading force in the movement to free Soviet Jewry, with many congregants traveled to the Soviet Union, and working throughout the country to mobilize support for the refuseniks.
The religious school and membership continued to grow, and the membership cap was repeatedly increased to support the growing Jewish community. Rabbi Taylor was one of the first Silver Fellows at Harvard University, and he also spent a sabbatical at Oxford University. After 25 years in the pulpit at Solel, he left to become the Rabbi of the Woodstock Jewish Congregation in Woodstock, VT.

Rabbi Evan Moffic, 2009–
Rabbi Evan Moffic began at Congregation Solel in July 2009. Rabbi Moffic has brought a new emphasis to welcoming interfaith families to the synagogue and renewed the synagogue's renowned religious school, along with educator Ashley Plotnick. Rabbi Moffic has also made social justice and renewing the synagogue connection to Israel a key focus. The rapidly growing synagogue has since added staff and a new building addition, which opened in March 2010.

Rabbi Isaac Serotta was Lakeside Congregation's rabbi from 1998 to the present day, making him the longest serving rabbi in the congregation's history.  He brought a renewed spirit to the congregation and in partnership with the congregation's long time educator, Vanessa Ehrlich, more than doubled the size of the congregation and its religious school. With an emphasis on education of children and adults, Lakeside built a strong education program while revitalizing the congregations efforts to promote social justice.  The congregation began sponsoring regular community trips to Israel including examinations of the political challenges of creating an equitable two state solution.
Under the leadership of Rabbi Serotta and Rabbi Moffic the congregations began collaborating of Shabbat and Holiday services and on social justice experiences.  Both rabbis were awarded one of the Reform Movement's highest honors, the Bearer of Light Award, for their participation with the NAACP for participating in the walk for racial justice from Selma to Washington D.C.  
It was only natural when these two colleagues and friends began to sow seeds for bringing the two congregations which had existed for half a century less than half a mile apart under one roof.  What must have looked like daunting differences in worship style in the 1950s looked like as distinction without a difference in the 21st century.  The two congregations formally joined together in 2019 with the membership of each community voting overwhelmingly in favor of coming together as Makom Solel Lakeside.  Makom means holy place, and the community strives to live up to that name.

Music
Makom Solel Lakeside boasts a large volunteer choir and an outstanding Cantor, Jay O'Brien.  Cantor O'Brien plays many instruments and is comfortable with a diverse array of musical styles from the music of Jewish summer camp to the formal settings of Jewish composer from the 18th century to today as well as the traditional chant of Torah and davenning style of eastern Europe.  The two legacy congregations have a rich and storied musical history, and have been served by fine choir directors, among them Dr. Warren Fremling and Dr. Richard Boldrey who is the Choir Director, Emeritus.  One of Dr. Boldrey's former students at Northwestern University currently serves as choir director. Cantors who served before Cantor O'Brien include Cantor Michael Davis, and Cantor Vicky Gliken.

Social Justice
The Congregation remains involved in an array of social action projects throughout Metropolitan Chicago, including membership in Lake Country United and a strong connection with the Religious Action Center of Reform Judaism and its affiliate RAC-IL.  Rabbi Serotta serves on the core committee of RAC-IL along with other members of Makom Solel Lakeside, and members of the community are also on the Commission for Social Action for the Reform Movement.  Others serve on the national board of the Union for Reform Judaism.  The congregation is a partner in JCUA (Jewish Council on Urban Affairs) and is active with ARZA, a progressive Reform Zionist organization. Members of the synagogue are also involved in an array of significant civic activities and organizations in Chicago.

Inclusiveness
Congregation Solel welcomes interfaith couples and families, and offers them full participation in lifecycle events, such as bar and bat mitzvah, weddings and baby namings. Diversity, Equity and Inclusion are important values of the community and we are always working toward creating a safe space for all in our Makom, our holy place.

References

External links
 Official website

Reform synagogues in Illinois
Jewish organizations established in 1957